Alaybey is the eastern terminus of the Karşıyaka Tram in İzmir, Turkey. The station consists of an island platform serving two tracks. Naldöken railway station is closer. Alaybey station was opened on 11 April 2017.

The station is located along Cemal Gürsel Avenue, on the waterfront.

References

Railway stations opened in 2017
2017 establishments in Turkey
Karşıyaka District
Tram transport in İzmir